Nnamdi Azikiwe University Teaching Hospital is a federal government of Nigeria teaching hospital located in Nnewi, Anambra state.   The current chief medical director is Joseph Ugboaja.

History 
Nnamdi Azikiwe University Teaching Hospital was established by the Anambra state government edict number 10 of 1988 as Anambra State University of Technology Teaching Hospital Nnewi and shared premises with the then General Hospital, Nnewi.  On June 16, 1990, the General Hospital merged with Nnamdi Azikiwe University Teaching Hospital. 

It was then official commissioned on 19 July, 1991 military governor, Robert Akonobi.

The hospital was renamed by the federal government of Nigeria to Nnamdi Azikiwe University Teaching Hospital  through decree number 68 in 1992, in honour of Nnamdi Azikiwe.

Departments 
The hospital consists of four outposts namely:

 The centre of community/primary health care, Ukpo, Dunukofia L.G.A.

 The trauma centre, Oba, Idemili South L.G.A.

 Federal staff clinic, Awka, Awka South L.G.A.

 The centre of community/primary health care, Umunya, Oyi L.G.A

References 

 Teaching hospitals in Nigeria